James Lea Anderson (born February 23, 1957)  is an American former infielder in Major League Baseball, playing mainly as a shortstop for three different teams in parts of six seasons spanning 1978–1984. Listed at 6'0", 170 lb. he batted and threw right handed.

Anderson was selected by the California Angels in the second round of the 1975 MLB draft. He debuted with the Angels in 1978, playing for them two years before joining the Seattle Mariners (1980–1981) and the Texas Rangers (1983–1984).

Anderson made his first major league appearance on July 2, 1978 at Anaheim Stadium, and he went 1-for-3 with a walk against Rangers pitchers Dock Ellis and Steve Comer, as the Angels won 4-3.

His most productive season came with the Mariners in 1980, when he posted career-highs in games played (116), starts (84), plate appearances (345), hits (72), home runs (8), RBI (30), and runs (46).

Anderson's career totals include 419 games played, a .218 batting average (211-for-970), 13 home runs, 86 RBI, 107 runs scored, and an on-base percentage of .280. A true utility man, he also made appearances at third base, second base, catcher and the corner outfield.

In between, Anderson played winter ball with the Leones del Caracas, Navegantes del Magallanes and Tiburones de La Guaira clubs of the Venezuelan League during the 1978–1983 seasons.

Achievements
Anderson led Texas League shortstops with 93 double plays while playing for the El Paso Diablos in 1977.
His first major league home run came off Rangers All-Star pitcher Jon Matlack at Arlington Stadium (June 26, 1979)
Had a pair of four-hit games (three doubles and a single) against the Kansas City Royals (July 1, 1979), and four singles vs. the Oakland Athletics (July 2, 1983)
Collected 10 three-hit games, the most impressive being a double and two singles, good for five RBI and two runs scored against the Milwaukee Brewers (May 6, 1981)
Hit a combined average of .338 (24-for-71) against All-Stars pitchers Bert Blyleven, Ron Guidry, Rick Honeycutt, Dave LaRoche, Jon Matlack, Bob Stanley, Dave Stieb, and Steve Stone
Hit a combined .286 (6-for-21) against Hall of Famers Ferguson Jenkins and Gaylord Perry

References
1979 Baseball Register published by The Sporting News

External links

Baseball Gauge
Venezuelan Professional Baseball League

1957 births
Living people
Albuquerque Dukes players
Baseball players from Los Angeles
California Angels players
Denver Bears players
El Paso Diablos players
Idaho Falls Angels players
Leones del Caracas players
Major League Baseball shortstops
Navegantes del Magallanes players
Oklahoma City 89ers players
Salinas Angels players
Salt Lake City Gulls players
Seattle Mariners players
Texas Rangers players
Tiburones de La Guaira players
American expatriate baseball players in Venezuela